The following is a list of compositions for organ from the Western tradition of classical organ music.

By composer

 Alain, Jehan
 Variations sur un thème de Clément Janequin
 Le Jardin suspendu
 Litanies
 Trois Danses
 Postlude pour l′office des Complines
 Albright, William
 Sweet Sixteenths
 Bach, Johann Sebastian (See also: List of organ compositions by Johann Sebastian Bach)
 Six Trio Sonatas (BWV 525–530)
 Preludes and Fugues (BWV 531–551)
 Toccatas and Fugues (BWV 564–566)
 Orgelbüchlein (Little Organ Book) (BWV 599–644)
 18 Chorale Preludes (the Leipzig Chorales) (BWV 651–668)
 Clavier-Übung III
 Prelude in E-flat major (BWV 552/I)
 "The German Organ Mass" (BWV 669–689)
 4 Duetti (BWV 802–805)
 Fugue in E-flat major (St. Anne) (BWV 552/II)
 Pastorale (BWV 590)
 Passacaglia and Fugue (BWV 582)
 The following are pieces that are thought to be wrongly attributed to Bach:
 Eight Short Preludes and Fugues (BWV 553–560) possibly composed by Johann Tobias Krebs
 Toccata and Fugue in D minor (BWV 565) – possibly Bach's transcription of a violin work, or indeed a piece by another composer
Beethoven, Ludwig van
 Fugue in D major for organ, WoO 31 (1783)
Berlioz, Hector
 Hymne pour l’élévation in D major for organ, H 100 (1844)
 Sérénade agreste à la Madone sur le thème des pifferari romains in E flat major for organ, H 98 (1844)
 Toccata in C major for organ, H 99 (1844)
 Boëllmann, Léon
 Suite Gothique
Nimrod Borenstein
Monologue opus 50 for solo organ (2008)  
Kol Nidreï opus 10 for solo organ (1996) 
 Brahms, Johannes
Fugue in ab minor WoO 8
Prelude and Fugue in a minor WoO 9
Prelude and Fugue in g minor WoO 10
Chorale Prelude and Fugue on „O Traurigkeit, o Herzeleid“ WoO 7
Eleven Chorale Preludes op. posth. 122
Bruckner, Anton
 Fugue in D minor for organ, WAB 125 (1861)
 Postlude in D minor for organ, WAB 126/1 (c. 1846)
 Andante (Prelude) in D minor for organ, WAB 126/2 (c. 1846)
 Prelude in E flat major for organ, WAB 127 (c. 1835, doubtful authorship, possibly by Johann Baptist Weiss)
 Four Preludes in E flat major for organ, WAB 128 (c. 1835, doubtful authorship, possibly by Johann Baptist Weiss)
 Prelude (Perger Präludium) in C major for organ, WAB 129 (1884)
 Prelude and Fugue in C minor for organ, WAB 131 (1847)
 Buxtehude, Dieterich
 Cabezón, Antonio de
 Tientos
 Aaron Copland
 Symphony for Organ and Orchestra (Symphony no. 1) (1924)
Costa, Fabio
Prelude-Meditation for Organ
 Couperin, François
2 Masses
 Miguel del Aguila
Organ Fantasy (1993)
One of You (2001)
Delbos, Claire
Deux pièces (1935)
Paraphrase sur le  dernier (1939)
L'Offrande à Marie (1943)
 Dupré, Marcel
Élévation op. 2
Trois Préludes et Fugues op. 7 (1914)
Scherzo op. 16 (1919)
Fifteen Pieces op. 18 (1919)
Cortège et Litanie op. 19 No. 2 (Transcription of the piano version, 1921)
Variations sur un Noël op. 20 (1922)
Suite Bretonne op. 21 (1923)
Symphonie-Passion op. 23 (1924)
Lamento op. 24 (1926)
Deuxième Symphonie op. 26 (1929)
Sept Pièces op. 27 (1931)
Seventy-Nine Chorales op. 28 (1931)
Le Chemin de la Croix op. 29 (1931)
Trois Élevations op. 32 (1935)
Angélus op. 34 No. 1 (1936)
Trois Préludes et Fugues op. 36 (1938)
Évocation op. 37 (1941)
Le Tombeau de Titelouze op. 38 (1942)
Suite op. 39 (1944)
Offrande à la Vierge op. 40 (1944)
Deux Esquisses op. 41 (1945)
Paraphrase on the Te Deum op. 43 (1945)
Vision op. 44 (1947)
Eight Short Preludes on Gregorian Themes op. 45 (1948)
Épithalame without opus (1948)
Variations sur 'Il est né le divin enfant' without opus (1948)
Miserere Mei op. 46 (1948)
Psaume XVIII op. 47 (1949)
Six Antiennes pour le Temps de Noël op. 48 (1952)
Vingt-Quatre Inventions op. 50 (1956)
Triptyque op. 51 (1957)
Nymphéas op. 54 (1959)
Annonciation op. 56 (1961)
Chorale et Fugue op. 57 (1962)
Trois Hymnes op. 58 (1963)
Two Chorales op. 59 (1963)
In Memoriam op. 61 (1965)
Méditation without opus (1966)
Entrée, Canzona et Sortie op. 62 (1967)
Quatre Fugues Modales op. 63 (1968)
Regina Coeli op. 64 (1969)
Vitrail op. 65 (1969)
Souvenir op. 65bis (1965)
 Duruflé, Maurice
 Prélude et Fugue sur le nom d'Alain op. 7
 Scherzo op. 2
 Veni Creator op. 4
 Prélude
 Adagio
 Chorale Variations
 Fugue sur le carillon des heures de la cathédrale de Soissons
 Suite for Organ (opus 5)
 Prélude
 Sicilienne
 Toccata
 Elgar, Edward
 Cantique, op. 3
 Vesper Voluntaries, op. 14
 Sonata in G major, op. 28
 Françaix, Jean
 Marche solennelle (1956)
 Suite carmélite (1960)
 Suite profane (1984)
 Messe de Mariage (1986)
 Franck, César
 Six Pièces
 Fantasie
 Grande Pièce Symphonique
 Prélude, Fugue et Variation
 Pastorale
 Prière
 Final
 Trois Pièces
 Fantasie
 Cantabile
 Pièce héroïque
 Trois Chorales
 No 1. in E major
 No 2. in B minor
 No 3. in A minor
 L'Organiste
 Frescobaldi, Girolamo
 Froberger, Johann Jakob
 Gigout, Eugène
 Grand Chœur Dialogué
 Ten Pieces
 1. Prelude-Chorale and Allegro
 2. Minuetto
 3. Absoute
 4. Toccata
 5. Andante religioso (in the form of a Canon)
 6. Rhapsodie (on Christmas carols)
 7. Offertoire ou Communion (Trio des Claviers)
 8. Scherzo
 9. Antienne (in Phrygian mode)
 10. Sortie (on Adoremus in Aeternum)
Guilmant, Alexandre
 Pièces dans différents styles
 L'Organiste liturgiste, Op.65
 Eight sonatas
Handel, George Frederic
 Six Organ Concertos, op.4
 Six Organ Concertos, no op. (including 3 concerti grossi)
 The Cuckoo and the Nightingale
 Six Organ Concertos, op.7
Harbison, John
What Do We Make of Bach? for obbligato organ and orchestra (2018)
Haydn, Franz Joseph
 Concerto Hob. XVIII:1 in C major for organ (or harpsichord) and orchestra (1756)
 Concerto Hob. XVIII:2 in D major for organ (or harpsichord) and orchestra (1767)
 Concerto Hob. XVIII:6 in F major for violin and organ (or harpsichord) with string orchestra (1766)
Hindemith, Paul
Kammermusik No. 7 for organ and chamber orchestra, Op. 46, No. 2 (1927)
Organ Sonata No. 1 (1937)
Organ Sonata No. 2 (1937)
Organ Sonata No. 3 (on ancient folk songs)(1940)
Organ Concerto (1962)
Hovhaness, Alan
 Howells, Herbert
 Six Pieces
 1. Fugue Chorale and Epilogue
 2. Master Tallis' Testament
 3. Paean
 4. Preludio 'Sine Nomine'
 5. Saraband (For the Morning of Easter)
 6. Saraband (In modo elegiaco)
 Three Psalm-Preludes, Set 1
 Three Psalm-Preludes, Set 2
 Three Rhapsodies
 Sonata for Organ
Ives, Charles
Variations on "America"
Jongen, Joseph
Karg-Elert, Sigfrid
 Langlais, Jean
 Neuf Pièces
 Fête
 Trois Paraphrases grégoriennes
 Suite médiévale
 Incantation pour un jour Saint
 Triptique
 Diptique
 Trois Méditations sur la Trinité
 Cinq Méditations sur l′Ascension
 Domenica in Palmis
 Poème Évangélique
 Suite Brève
 Douze Petites Pièces
 Rosa Mystica
 Te Deum
 Hymne de l′Action de Grâce
 Livre d'Orgue (40 Pièces)
 Livre du Sacrement
 Prelude and Fugue
 Scherzo
 Toccata
 Première Symphonie
 Deuxième Symphonie
 Troisième Symphonie
 24 Pièces pour orgue
 7 Chorales
 Rosace 4 pièces diverses
 Soleis 5 pièces pour Orgue
 Sonatine
 Neuf Pièces pour orgue
 Suite Française
 Four Postludes
 Hommage à Frescobaldi
 Folkloric Suite
 Office pour la Sainte Famille
 Office pour la Sainte Trinité
 Poem of Life
 Poem of Peace
 Poem of Happiness
 Sonata en Trio
 Livre Écuménique
 Deux Pièces
 Three Voluntaries
 Trois Implorations
 Offrande à Marie
 Suite Baroque
 Huit Chants de Bretagne
 Trois Esquisses Romanes
 Trois Esquisses Gothiques
 Mosaïque 1
 Mosaïque 2
 Mosaïque 3
 Triptyque Grégorien
 Progression
 Trois Noëls
 Offrande à une âme
 Chant des bergers – Prière des mages
 Prélude et allegro
 Sept Études de Concert pour pédale solo
 Deux Pièces brèves
 Huit Préludes
 Miniature II
 Talitah Koum
 Trois Pièces faciles
 B.A.C.H
 American Folk–Hymn Settings
 In Memoriam
 Douze Versets
 Hommage à Rameau
 Expressions
 Fantasy on Two Old Scottish Themes
 Trumpet Tune
 Christmas Carol Hymn Settings
 Contrastes
 Mort et Résurrection
 Moonlight Scherzo
 Trois Offertoires
 Suite in Simplicitate
 Trio
 Jean-Pierre Leguay
 Cinq Esquisses pour piano et orgue (1959–60)
 Prélude, trio de timbres, fugato pour orgue (1961)
 Au Maître de la Paix pour orgue (1963–64)
 Cinq versets sur Veni Creator pour orgue (1965)
 Sextuor pour flûte, hautbois, clarinet, cor, basson, piano (1967)
 Péan I pour orgue, 3 trombones, marimba, percussions (1968–2010)
 Gitanjâli pour grand orchestre (1969)
 Aurore pour flûte, hautbois, violoncelle et harpe (1969–70)
 Péan II, pour trompette et orgue (1970–71)
 Péan III, pour orgue (1971–72)
 Hexagonal, pour flûte et orgue (1972)
 Angle, pour deux harpes (1972)
 Flamme, pour hautbois ou saxophone alto (1973)
 Sonate I pour orgue (1973–74)
 Sève, pour saxophone et piano (1974)
 Granit (Version I), pour 4 trombones et orgue (1975)
 XIX Préludes, pour orgue (1965–75)
 Job, pour choeur de femmes et orgue (1976)
 Le matin sûrement va venir, pour Ondes Martenot, piano, percussions (1977)
 Trio pour violon, alto et violoncelle (1978)
 Madrigal I, pour 4 trombones (1979)
 Madrigal II, pour orgue (1979)
 Préludes XX, pour orgue (1980)
 Prélude XXI, pour orgue (1980)
 Prélude XXII, pour orgue (1980)
 Etoilé pour clavecin ou orgue positif et 5 instrumentistes (1981)
 Madrigal III, pour clavecin ou orgue positif (1982)
 Prélude XXIII, pour orgue (1982)
 Madrigal IV, pour guitare (1982)
 Sonate II, pour orgue (1982–83)
 Madrigal V, pour orgue (1983)
 Scabbs, pour saxophone alto et contrebasse ou saxophone baryton (1983–84)
 Souffle, pour 14 instrumentistes (1984)
 Madrigal VI, pour 4 saxophones (1985)
 Madrigal VII, pour orgue (1985)
 Cinq pièces pour alto, contrebasse, percussions (1985–86)
 Aube, pour orgue positif et orchestre de chambre (1986)
 Vigiles, pour choeur, orgue, trombone, percussions (1986)
 Madrigal VIII, pour percussions (1986–89)
 Chant d'airain, pour trombone ténor (1986)
 Prélude I, pour guitare (1986)
 Granit (Version II), pour 2 trompettes, 2 trombones et orgue (1987)
 Madrigal IX, pour orgue (1988)
 Chant, pour choeur de femmes et percussion (1989–90)
 Quatuor, pour quatuor à cordes (1989–95)
 Capriccio, pour orgue (1990)
 Azur, pour piano (1990–91)
 Spicilège, pour orgue (1992–93)
 Horizon, pour orgue (1995)
 Animato, pour orgue (1995)
 Psaume XXI, pour sextuor vocal a capella (1996–97)
 Trois esquisses, pour flûte avec ou sans piano (1998)
 Secundum Matthaeum, pour ténor et orgue (1999)
 Missa Deo Gratias, pour soprano solo, chœur mixte, un ou deux orgues, cuivres et percussion (1999–2000)
 Brève, pour orgue (2000)
 Pater Noster, pour ténor avec ou sans orgue (2000–01)
 Alleluia, pour ténor avec ou sans orgue (2001)
 Sept pièces brèves, pour flûte et orgue (2003–04)
 Péan IV, pour orgue (2004)
 Sonate III, pour orgue (2005–06)
 Cinq reflets, pour orgue (2006)
 Et puis, et puis encore ?, pour orgue (2008)
 Cendre d'ailes, pour voix de ténor et piano sur des poèmes d'Henri Michaux (2009–10)
 Brève II,  pour orgue (2010)
 Allume l'aube dans la source, pour piano (2010–11)
 Et il chante l'aurore, pour orgue (2012)
 Liszt, Franz
 Fantasia and Fugue on Ad Nos, ad salutarem undam
 Prelude and Fugue on B-A-C-H
 Évocation à la Chapelle Sixtine
 Variations über Weinen, Klagen, Sorgen, Zagen (organ arr. of piano piece)
 William Lloyd Webber (1914–1982)
 Chorale, Cantilena and Finale
 Three Recital Pieces (1952)
 Aria, 13 Pieces
 Reflections, 7 Pieces
 Eight Varied Pieces
 Songs without Words, 6 Pieces
 Five Portraits for Home Organs
 Elegy
 Six Interludes on Christmas Carols
 Machajdík, Peter (1961)
 On the Seven Colours of Light  (2007)
 Portus Pacis (2016)
 De humilitate (2018)
 Zem (2018)
 Da perenne gaudium' (2021)
 Magle, Frederik
 Symphony for organ No.1 (1990)
 Symphony for organ No.2 Let there be light (1993)
 Human's Millenium (2000)
 Cantilena for organ (2003)
 Viva voce (2008)
 To Become (2009
 Like a Flame (2009–2010), 22 improvisations subsequently written down.
 Mathias, WilliamPrelude, Elegy and Toccata (1954)Partita Op.19 (1962)Variations on a Hymn Tune Op.20 (1962)Postlude (1962)Processional (1964)Chorale (Easter 1966)Invocations Op.35 (1967)Toccata Giocosa Op.36 No.2 (1967) Dedicated to Sir David Willcocks on the occasion of his Inauguration of the new organ at The Royal College of Organists, 7 October 1967Jubilate Op.67, No.2 (1974) Dedicated to Michael SmytheFantasy Op.78 (1978)Canzonetta Op.78 No.2 (1978)Antiphonies Op.88 No.2 (1982)Berceuse Op.95 No.3 (1985)Recessional Op.96 No.4 (1986) Dedicated to Christopher Morris, musician, publisher, friendFanfare (1987)Carillon (1989)Fenestra (1989)
 Mendelssohn, Felix
 Three Preludes and Fugues, Op.37
 Six Sonatas (1844–1845)
 No. 1 in F minor
 No. 2 in C minor
 No. 3 in A major (Aus tiefer Not schrei ich zu dir)
 No. 4 in Bb major
 No. 5 in D major
 No. 6 in D minor (Vater unser im Himmelreich)
 Messiaen, Olivier
 Le Banquet Céleste (1928)
 Diptyque (1929)
 Apparition de l'église éternelle (1931)
 L'Ascension (1933) – 4 méditations
 La Nativité du Seigneur (1935) – 9 méditations
 Les Corps glorieux (1939) – 7 short visions
 Messe de la Pentecôte (1950)
 Livre d'orgue (1951) – 7 pièces
 Verset pour la Fête de la Dédicace (1960)
 Méditations sur le Mystère de la Sainte Trinité (1969) – 9 pièces
 Livre du Saint-Sacrement (1984) – 18 pièces
Mozart, Wolfgang Amadeus
 Seventeen Church Sonatas (For 2 violins, cello, bass and organ)
 Adagio and Allegro for Mechanical organ in F minor K.594
 Fantasia for Mechanical organ in F minor K.608
 Andante for Mechanical organ in F major K.616
 Pachelbel, Johann
7 Preludes
15 Toccatas
3 Fantasias
2 Ricercares
Prelude and Fugue in E Minor
Toccata and Fugue in B-flat Major
19 Fugues
98 Magnificat Fugues
72 Chorale Settings
Palestine, Charlemagne
Spectral Continuum (1970–81)
Schlingen-Blängen (1985)
Schlongo!!!daLUVdrone (1998)
 Pincemaille, Pierre
 Prologue et Noël varié, Delatour (2007)
 Poulenc, Francis
 Concerto for Organ, Tympani and Strings
 Reger, Max
 Reubke, Julius
 Sonata on the 94th Psalm
 Rheinberger, Josef
 2 organ concertos
 20 organ sonatas
 12 Fughettas, Op. 123
 12 Monologues, Op. 162
 12 Meditations, Op. 167
 Preludes, trios, character pieces
 Works for solo instruments (violin and oboe) with organ
 Saint-Saëns, Camille
 Op. 78 Symphony No. 3 (Saint-Saëns) (1886)
 Op. 99 Preludes and Fugues for organ (1894)
 Prelude and Fugue in E flat major, no. 3.
 Op. 101 Fugatos from the organ works: Fantasia in D flat major for organ (1866)
 Op. 109 Preludes and Fugues for organ (1898)
 Salieri, Antonio
 Concerto for organ and orchestra in C major (1773)
 Schumann, Robert
 Six Studies in the Form of Canons for Organ, Op. 56 (1845)
 Four Sketches for Organ, Op. 58 (1845)
 Six Fugues on B-A-C-H for Organ, Op. 60 (1845)
 Seixas, Jose Antonio Carlos de
 Serry, Sr., John
Processional (Wedding March for Organ, 1968)
 Elegy ( Liturgical organ, 1986)
 A Savior Is Born (Liturgical, Organ & Voice 1991)
 The Lord's Prayer (Liturgical, Organ & Chorus 1992)
 American Rhapsody (revised for Organ 2002)
 Concerto for Free Bass Accordion (revised for Organ 2002)
Shchetynsky, AlexanderShapes and Colours (1999)
 Sonata (2021)
Dave Soldier
Hockets and Inventions, op. 6 (1990)
Organum, Book I, op. 23 (2011)
Svoboda, Tomas
Symphony No. 3 for Organ & Orchestra, op. 43 (1965)
Offertories for Organ (Vol. I), op. 52a (1949–96)
Wedding March for Organ, op. 94 (1979)
Nocturne for Organ, 4-hand, op.155 (1996)
Duo Concerto for Trumpet & Organ, op. 152 (1997)
 Sweelinck, Jan Pieterszoon
Fantasias, toccatas, variations on hymns and songs
 Tal, Josef (1910–2008)
 Salva venia (1983)
 Titelouze, Jean (ca 1563–1633)Hymnes de l'Église pour toucher sur l'orgue (1623)Le Magnificat'' (1626)
 Tournemire, Charles
L'Orgue Mystique
 Vierne, Louis
 Organ Symphonies
 No. 1 in D minor (Op. 14, 1899)
 No. 2 in E minor (Op. 20, 1902)
 No. 3 in F sharp minor (Op. 28, 1911)
 No. 4 in G minor (Op. 32, 1914)
 No. 5 in A minor (Op. 47, 1924)
 No. 6 in B minor (Op. 59, 1930)
 24 Pièces de Fantaisie
 Suite 1
 Prélude
 Andantino
 Caprice
 Intermezzo
 Requiem aeternam
 Marche nuptiale
 Suite 2
 Lamento
 Sicilienne
 Hymne au Soleil
 Feux Follets
 Clair de Lune
 Toccata
 Suite 3
 Dédicace
 Impromptu
 Étoile du Soir
 Fantômes
 Sur le Rhin
 Carillon de Westminster
 Suite 4
 Aubade
 Résignation
 Cathédrales
 Naïades
 Gargouilles et chimères
 Les Cloches de Hinckley
 Widor, Charles-Marie
 Symphonie pour orgue No. 1 op. 13 no. 1 (1872, Julien Hamelle)
 Symphonie pour orgue No. 2 op. 13 no. 2 (1872, Hamelle)
 Symphonie pour orgue No. 3 op. 13 no. 3 (1872, Hamelle)
 Symphonie pour orgue No. 4 op. 13 no. 4 (1872, Hamelle)
 Marche Américaine (transc. by Marcel Dupré: no. 11 from 12 Feuillets d’Album op. 31, Hamelle)
 Symphonie pour orgue No. 5 op. 42 no. 1 (1879, Hamelle)
 Symphonie pour orgue No. 6 op. 42 no. 2 (1879, Hamelle)
 Symphonie pour orgue No. 7 op. 42 no. 3 (1887, Hamelle)
 Symphonie pour orgue No. 8 op. 42 no. 4 (1887, Hamelle)
 Marche Nuptiale op. 64 (1892) (trasc., from Conte d'Avril, Hamelle)
 Symphonie pour orgue No. 9 "Gothique" op. 70 (1895, Schott)
 Symphonie pour orgue No. 10 "Romane" op. 73 (1900, Hamelle)
 Suite Latine op. 86 (1927, Durand)
 Trois Nouvelles Pièces op. 87 (1934, Durand)
 Bach's Memento (1925, Hamelle)

See also

 Organ Symphony
 List of organ symphonies
 List of organ composers

Principal source 
A Directory of Composers for Organ by Dr. John Henderson, Hon. Librarian to the Royal School of Church Music 2005 3rd edition 

 Compositions
Organ